Janqur (also Romanized as Jānqūr; also known as Dzhangur and Jangur) is a village in Bedevostan-e Gharbi Rural District, Khvajeh District, Heris County, East Azerbaijan Province, Iran. At the 2006 census, its population was 1,940, in 492 families.

References 

Populated places in Heris County